Stone Ridge School of the Sacred Heart is a Catholic, independent, college preparatory school, founded in 1923, in the Network of Sacred Heart schools for girls. The school offers grades 1-12 and a co-educational early childhood program.

History 
Stone Ridge was established in downtown Washington, DC at 1719 Massachusetts Avenue, NW in 1923.  By the end of the Second World War, the school had outgrown the original building. In 1947, the Society of the Sacred Heart bought 25 acres and their estate, known as "Stone Ridge," in Bethesda, Maryland from Mr. and Mrs. George Hamilton. To this day, the original mansion of the Hamilton estate, a grand neo-Georgian edifice built in 1904, is known as "Hamilton House".

Athletics 
Stone Ridge girls compete athletically in the Independent School League. In 2015, a turf field was added to the campus. It is lined for field hockey, soccer and lacrosse.

Campus 
It hosts the classes of the Washington Japanese Language School (ワシントン日本語学校 Washington Nihongo Gakkō), a supplementary school for Japanese children subsidized by the Japanese government.

Notable alumnae
 Andrea Koppel (1981)
 Cokie Roberts (1960)
 Maria Shriver (1973)
 Frederica von Stade (finished at Sacred Heart in Noroton, CT)
 Kathleen Kennedy Townsend (finished at The Putney School in Vermont)
 Barbara Lynn-Follansbee (1985), former FCC attorney and current Vice President Strategic Initiatives & Partnerships at USTelecom
 Katie Ledecky (2015)

See also
 Network of Sacred Heart Schools
 Madeleine Sophie Barat
 Philippine Duchesne

References

 History of the school at the official website
 Goals and Criteria of a Sacred Heart Education

External links

Official Facebook Page
 Network of Sacred Heart Schools
 Associated Alumnae and Alumni of the Sacred Heart
 United States Province of the Society of the Sacred Heart

Independent School League
Schools in Bethesda, Maryland
Educational institutions established in 1923
Girls' schools in Maryland
Catholic secondary schools in Maryland
Catholic elementary schools in the United States
Sacred Heart schools in the United States
Private middle schools in Maryland
Private elementary schools in Maryland
1923 establishments in Washington, D.C.